Pest or The Pest may refer to:

Science and medicine
 Pest (organism), an animal or plant deemed to be detrimental to humans or human concerns
 Weed, a plant considered undesirable
 Infectious disease, an illness resulting from an infection
 Plague (disease), an infectious disease caused by the bacterium Yersinia pestis
 Black Death (the Plague), the deadliest pandemic recorded in human history

Film
 The Pest (1914 film), an American short film starring Charlie Chaplin
 The Pest (1917 film), an American film starring Oliver Hardy
 The Pest (1919 film), an American film starring Mabel Normand
 The Pest (1922 film), an American film starring Stan Laurel
 The Pest (1997 film), an American film starring John Leguizamo

Music
 Pest (band), a British music group
 Pest (musician) (born 1975), Norwegian black metal vocalist

Places
 Pest, Hungary, the geographic region of Budapest
 Royal University of Pest
 Pest County, an administrative division of Hungary, surrounding Budapest

Other uses
 PESTS, an anonymous activist arts group
 Pest (ice hockey), an ice hockey player specialising in aggravating opponents

See also
 PEST (disambiguation)
 Pestilence (disambiguation)
 Annoyance, a mental state characterized by irritation and distraction